Dan Duane Angel (born December 23, 1939) is a former member of the Michigan House of Representatives and college administrator.

Early life
Angel was born on December 23, 1939 in Detroit, Michigan.

Education
In 1961, Angel earned a B.S. from Wayne State University. In 1963, Angel earned an M.A. from the same college. Both of these degrees were in education. In 1965, Angel earned a Ph.D. from Purdue University in communications. In 1964, while pursuing this doctoral degree, Angel served as a participant observer in the re-election campaign of Michigan Governor George W. Romney for research purposes. During this time, Angel served as Lenore Romney's escort and drove Governor Romney's press vehicle. Angel conducted six interviews with Governor Romney.

Career
In 1967, Angel released a biography of Romney entitled Romney, A Political Biography. In 1970, Angel released a biography of former Michigan Governor William Milliken entitled William G. Milliken: A Touch of Steel. On November 7, 1972, Angel was elected to the Michigan House of Representatives, where he represented the 49th district from January 1, 1973 until his resignation early in 1978. Angel resigned due to the frustration found in dealing with the various agendas in a legislative body. Angel went on to work as a college administrator. Angel went on to serve as the president of six colleges in three different states. At some point, Angel served as the president of Imperial Valley College, Stephen F. Austin University, as well as Marshall University. In January 2005, with over 30 years of college administration experience, Angel started serving as the president of Golden Gate University. On August 3, 2015, Angel retired from the position.

Personal life
In 1965, Angel married Patricia Ann Schuster. Angel is Methodist.

References

Living people
1939 births
Methodists from Michigan
Politicians from Detroit
Golden Gate University faculty
Stephen F. Austin State University faculty
Wayne State University alumni
Presidents of Marshall University
Purdue University alumni
Republican Party members of the Michigan House of Representatives
20th-century American politicians
20th-century American biographers